Cataclysta marginipuncta is a Crambidae species in the genus Cataclysta. It was described by Turner in 1937. It is found in Queensland in Australia.

Adults have a broad pattern of shades of brown on their wings. There is an arc of black spots along the margin of each hindwing.

References

Moths described in 1937
Acentropinae